Isola Sant'Antonio is a comune (municipality) in the Province of Alessandria in the Italian region Piedmont, located about  east of Turin and about  northeast of Alessandria.

Isola Sant'Antonio borders the following municipalities: Alluvioni Piovera, Alzano Scrivia, Bassignana, Casei Gerola, Castelnuovo Scrivia, Cornale, Gambarana, Guazzora, Mezzana Bigli, Molino dei Torti, Pieve del Cairo, and Sale.

Twin towns
  Saint-Jean-de-Folleville, France

References

Cities and towns in Piedmont